Corey Mace (born December 22, 1985) is a former Canadian football defensive tackle who is currently the defensive coordinator for the Toronto Argonauts of the Canadian Football League (CFL). He was signed by the Buffalo Bills as an undrafted free agent in 2007. He played college football at Wyoming.

College career
Mace played college football at Palomar College before transferring to the University of Wyoming.

Professional career

2007 CFL Draft
Mace was drafted by the Winnipeg Blue Bombers in the second round of the 2007 CFL Draft. Mace signed with the NFL's Buffalo Bills just before draft day.

Buffalo Bills
Mace signed with the Buffalo Bills as an undrafted free agent in 2007. He spent two seasons with the team, appearing in three games in 2008 and recording one tackle. He was not tendered a contract offer as an exclusive-rights free agent in the 2009 offseason.

Hamilton Tiger-Cats
The Hamilton Tiger-Cats acquired Mace's CFL rights (from the Blue Bombers) along with a 2009 CFL Draft first round pick in exchange for linebacker Zeke Moreno in the 2008 CFL season. Mace and the Tiger-Cats got into a contract dispute following the 2009 season. Mace wanted to receive a contract of one-year plus an option year that would enable him to explore NFL options in 2010 with a salary comparable to that of an NFL practice roster player of $95,000. The Tiger-Cats were said to be offering closer to the $65,000 normally offered to second-round draft choices.

Toronto Argonauts
Mace was acquired by the Toronto Argonauts, along with a 2010 third-round pick and a conditional pick in 2011 for disgruntled receiver Arland Bruce III.

Buffalo Bills (II)
Mace was re-signed by the Buffalo Bills on July 31, 2009. He was waived on September 5 was re-signed to the practice squad the next day. He was signed off the practice squad to the active roster on November 28. He appeared in 2 games and recorded one tackle and one interception, which was returned for 0 yards. On December 7, he was waived by the Bills and added to the practice squad on December 10.

Calgary Stampeders
Mace's CFL rights were traded by the Toronto Argonauts on August 22, 2010, in exchange for non-import linebacker Tristan Black. After the Argonauts traded Mace's rights to the Stampeders, he signed a contract on Aug 29, 2010 to join the Stampeders for the remainder of the 2010 CFL season. Despite being drafted by the Blue Bombers having playing experience with the Bills, Mace did not receive any CFL playing time until the 2010 CFL season. Mace appeared in eight games for the Stamps during the 2010 season. He recovered a fumble and returned it 60 yards to the endzone. In Week 1 of the 2011 CFL season, Mace suffered a ruptured Achilles tendon which caused him to miss the remainder of the season. Mace played a more significant role in the 2012 CFL season recording 25 tackles and one sack. Mace suffered a torn shoulder labrum in Week 1 of the 2013 CFL season which caused him to undergo season-ending surgery. Mace only played in eight of the 18 regular season game during the 2014 CFL season. He played in both of the Stamps playoff games, and won the 102nd Grey Cup. Following the 2014 season, Mace and the Stampeders agreed to terms of a new contract, preventing him from becoming a free-agent. However, he was injured all year and did not play in a game in 2015. After the 2015 season, where he was kept to the sidelines due to injury, Mace retired from playing professional football.

Coaching career

Calgary Stampeders
On December 10, 2015, following his retirement, he was announced as the Calgary Stampeders' defensive line coach, replacing his former teammate and coach Devone Claybrooks who stepped into the role of Stampeders defensive coordinator. He won his first Grey Cup as a coach when the Stampeders won the 106th Grey Cup over the Ottawa Redblacks.

Toronto Argonauts
On January 6, 2022, it was announced that Mace had joined the Toronto Argonauts as the team's defensive coordinator. On November 29, 2022, it was reported by TSN insider Farhan Lalji that Mace was one of three finalists for the vacant Ottawa Redblacks head coaching job.

References

External links
 Buffalo Bills bio
 Calgary Stampeders bio 
 Wyoming Cowboys bio

1985 births
Living people
People from Port Moody
Sportspeople from British Columbia
Black Canadian players of American football
American football defensive tackles
American football defensive ends
Wyoming Cowboys football players
Buffalo Bills players
Calgary Stampeders players
Palomar Comets football players
Calgary Stampeders coaches
Toronto Argonauts coaches